The France men's national under-18 ice hockey team is the men's national under-18 ice hockey team of France. The team is controlled by the French Ice Hockey Federation, a member of the International Ice Hockey Federation. The team represents France at the IIHF World U18 Championships.

International competitions

IIHF World U18 Championships

External links
France at IIHF.com

Ice hockey in France
National under-18 ice hockey teams
Ice hockey